Mary Sophia Bentham ( 1765 – 1858) was a British botanist and author.

Bentham was daughter of chemist George Fordyce (1736–1802), wife of mechanical engineer Samuel Bentham (1757–1831), and mother of botanist George Bentham (1800–1884).

References

British women scientists
1858 deaths
British botanists
Year of birth uncertain